Maini is a village in Khyber Pakhtunkhwa, Pakistan.

It may also refer to:

Places
 Maini, a village in Chhattisgarh, Jashpur, India
 Maini, a town in Khyber Pakhtunkhwa, Pakistan
 Maini, Nepal, a village in Nepal
 Maínis, an island off the Conamara coast in the heart of the Conamara Gaeltacht

Names

First name
 Maini Sorri (born 1957), a Swedish–Finnish singer

Surnames
 Arjun Maini (1997), an Indian racing driver
 Cenel Maini, who ruled Tethbae
 Chetan Maini, an Indian businessman
 Giampiero Maini (born 1971), a retired Italian professional footballer
 Giovanni Battista Maini (1690–1752), an Italian sculptor of the Late-Baroque period
 Joe Maini (1930–1964), an American jazz alto saxophonist
 Kush Maini (born 2000), an Indian Formula 3 racing driver
 Orlando Maini (born 1958), a former Italian cyclist
 Philip Maini, (born 1959), professor of Mathematical Biology, University of Oxford
 Sir Ravinder N. Maini (1937 - ), a rheumatology professor, Imperial College, London

See also
 Miani (disambiguation)